Ariyevo (Arıy) is a rural locality (a village) and the administrative centre of Ariyevsky Selsoviet, Duvansky District, Bashkortostan, Russia. The population was 385 as of 2010. There are 4 streets.

Geography 
Ariyevo is located 13 km north of Mesyagutovo (the district's administrative centre) by road. Mulkatovo is the nearest rural locality.

References 

Rural localities in Duvansky District